WQFR-LP (107.9 FM) was a radio station formerly licensed to serve Somerville, Tennessee, United States. The station was owned by Somerville Educational Broadcasting.

On August 27, 2012, the station's license was cancelled by the Federal Communications Commission (FCC) for failure to file a renewal application. WQFR-LP's call sign was simultaneously deleted from the FCC's database.

References

External links
 

QFR-LP
Fayette County, Tennessee
Radio stations disestablished in 2012
Defunct radio stations in the United States
2012 disestablishments in Kentucky
QFR-LP